Accused or The Accused may refer to:

 A person suspected with committing a crime or offence; see Criminal charge
 Suspect, a known person suspected of committing a crime
 The Accüsed, a 1980s Seattle crossover thrash band
The Accused, a play by Jeffrey Archer
Accused (podcast) a podcast produced by Wondery

Film 
 Accused (1925 film), an American silent film directed by Dell Henderson
 Accused (1936 film), a British film starring Douglas Fairbanks, Jr. and Dolores del Río
 Accused (1964 film), a Czechoslovakian film directed by Ján Kadár and Elmar Klos
 Accused (2005 film), a Danish film
 Accused (2014 film), a Dutch film
 The Accused (1949 film), an American  film starring Loretta Young and Robert Cummings
 The Accused (1960 film), an Argentine crime drama 
 The Accused (1988 film), a film starring Jodie Foster and Kelly McGillis
 The Accused (2018 film), an Argentine film

Television 
 Accused (1958 TV series), an American courtroom drama television series
 Accused (1996 TV series), a British television legal drama series
 Accused (2010 TV series), a British television series created by Jimmy McGovern
 Accused (2023 TV series), an American crime anthology series on Fox
 "Accused", an episode of the TV series In the Heat of the Night